Basilio Martín Patino (29 October 1930, in Lumbrales, Salamanca Province – 13 August 2017, in Madrid) was a Spanish film director, specializing in a creative approach to documentary works. Patino produced pieces on the Spanish Civil War (Canciones para después de una guerra), the famous dictator (Caudillo), or his executioners (Queridísimos verdugos). He also produced fiction (Nueve cartas a Berta, Octavia). Patino often experimented with new technologies, including digital tools, 3D, and offline editing.

In 1977, he was a member of the jury at the 27th Berlin International Film Festival. In 2005, he received the Gold Medal from the Spanish Academy of Cinema.

Filmography 
El noveno (1960)
Torerillos, 61 (1962)
Nueve cartas a Berta (1966)
 Love and Other Solitudes (1969)
Paseo por los letreros de Madrid (1968) with J. L. García Sánchez
Canciones para después de una guerra (1971)
Queridísimos verdugos (1973)
Caudillo (1974)
Hombre y Ciudad (1980)
Retablo de la Guerra Civil Española (1980)
Inquisición y Libertad (1982) with J. L. García Sánchez
El Nacimiento de un Nuevo Mundo (1982) with J. L. García Sánchez
El Horizonte Ibérico (1983) with Elbia Álvarez
La Nueva Ilustración Española (1983) with J. L. García Sánchez
Los paraísos perdidos (1985)
Madrid (1987)
Octavia (2002)
Homenaje a Madrid (2004)
Corredores de fondo (2005)
Fiesta (2005)
Capea (2005)
Libre te quiero (2012)

References

External links
 Official home page

1930 births
2017 deaths
People from the Province of Salamanca
Spanish film directors
Film directors from Castile and León
University of Salamanca alumni